Maunder may refer to:

 Maunder (lunar crater)
 Maunder (Martian crater)
 Maunder (surname)
 Maunder Minimum, a period in the 17th–18th centuries when sunspots became exceedingly rare